Raúl Conti (5 February 1928 – 5 August 2008) was an Argentine professional football player. He also held Italian citizenship. 

In 1962, he played in the Eastern Canada Professional Soccer League with Toronto Italia.

References

1928 births
2008 deaths
Argentine footballers
Argentine people of Italian descent
Argentine expatriate footballers
Expatriate footballers in France
Expatriate footballers in Italy
Expatriate footballers in Monaco
Serie A players
Serie B players
Ligue 1 players
Ligue 2 players
Eastern Canada Professional Soccer League players
Racing Club de Avellaneda footballers
Club Atlético River Plate footballers
AS Monaco FC players
Juventus F.C. players
Atalanta B.C. players
S.S.C. Bari players
Toronto Italia players
Citizens of Italy through descent
Argentine emigrants to Italy
Argentine expatriate sportspeople in Monaco
Argentine expatriate sportspeople in Italy
Association football midfielders